Anders Carlson may refer to:
 Anders Carlson (runner)
 Anders Carlson (American football)

See also
 Anders Carlsson (disambiguation)